Arnold Marlé (15 September 1887 – 21 February 1970) was a German actor who appeared largely in British films and television programmes.

Stage work
His theatre work included appearances on the London stage, and a year-and-a-half-long run on Broadway in Paddy Chayefsky's The Tenth Man in 1959-1961.

Family
In 1917 Marlé married actress Lily Freud, daughter of Sigmund Freud's sister Maria "Mitzi" Moritz-Freud and her husband (and cousin), Moritz Freud. They adopted Angela Seidmann-Freud when her mother, Tom Seidmann-Freud died in 1930.

Partial filmography

 Das Fräulein von Scuderi (1919) - René Cardillac, Goldschmied
 George Bully (1920)
 The Drums of Asia (1921)
 Night of the Burglar (1921)
 The Shadow of Gaby Leed (1921)
 Maciste and the Javanese (1922)
 The Malay Junk (1924)
 Dood Water (1934) - Dirk Brak
 One of Our Aircraft Is Missing (1942) - Pieter Sluys
 Thunder Rock (1942) - President of the Medical Society (uncredited)
 Mr. Emmanuel (1944) - Herr Kahn
 Men of Two Worlds (1946) - Prof. Gollner
 White Cradle Inn (1947) - Joseph
 Portrait from Life (1949) - Professor Franz Menzel
 The Glass Mountain (1949) - Manager of Teatro La Fenice
 The Floating Dutchman (1952) - Otto
 The Green Carnation (1954) - Vittorio Miranda
 The Glass Cage (1955) - Pop Maroni (scenes deleted)
 Break in the Circle (1955) - Prof. Pal Kudnic
 Little Red Monkey (1955) - Prof. Leon Dushenko
 Cross Channel (1955) - Papa Moreau
 They Can't Hang Me (1955) - Professor Karl Kopek
 Zarak (1956) - Flower seller
 The Abominable Snowman (1957) - Lhama
 The Naked Truth (1957) - Scientist (uncredited)
 Davy (1958) - Winkler
 Operation Amsterdam (1959)
 The Man Who Could Cheat Death (1959) - Dr. Ludwig Weiss 
 The Snake Woman (1961) - Dr. Murton 
 The Password Is Courage (1962) - Old Man on Train (uncredited)

References

External links

1887 births
1970 deaths
Male actors from Berlin
German male stage actors
German male film actors
German male silent film actors
German male television actors
20th-century German male actors
German expatriates in the United Kingdom